Lucile Lawrence (February 7, 1907 in New Orleans – July 8, 2004 in Englewood, New Jersey) was a leader among American harpists. At the end of her life, she was actively teaching as a faculty member of Boston University and the Manhattan School of Music as well as teaching privately.

Career
Lawrence was born into a prominent family with historic roots in New England (Lawrence, Massachusetts). Her father was a prominent businessman in New Orleans, at one time owner of the first cold-storage warehouse in the city. He once boated the length of the Mississippi with Mr. Hormel, of the meat-packing plant in Minnesota.

She was a fourth-generation harpist, beginning her studies at age six. Her aunt was for many years a prominent non-professional Boston harpist, who performed the Boston premiere of the Debussy Sonata for harp, flute and viola. At the age of eight, Lucile appeared as soloist with the New Orleans Junior Philharmonic. A prodigious student, she was introduced to Carlos Salzedo while he was in New Orleans performing on tour with his Trio de Lutece, and began private study with him in New York and Seal Harbor at age fourteen, then returned to finish high school at age fifteen, thereafter studying full-time in New York.

Her advanced studies were all conducted privately, with music history and theory lessons taken with the eminent composer Edgard Varese. [all notes from private conversations with Miss Lawrence and other published articles] Her studies consisted of at least two harp lessons a week, piano study and practicing harp four to five hours daily, along with two hours of piano, French studies, and swimming and riding. It was during summers of study in the artistic colony of Seal Harbor, Maine that Lucile came to know many society people and prominent musicians. She recalled the games of charades all would gather to play, and how Leopold Stokowski would swaddle his head in diapers to play the clue, "Moses in the bullrushes".

She made her professional debut at age 18 with an eight-month concert tour of Australia and New Zealand, a lengthy 123-concert tour of joint recitals with the soprano Edna Thomas. She enjoyed recalling lunching with Fritz Kreisler while on tour, as he was also touring the same area.

Upon returning to the U.S., she continued her private study with Salzedo, toured as first harpist in the Salzedo Harp Ensemble throughout the U.S., and with her own Lawrence Harp Quintette on smaller engagements. She then married Salzedo, an event that was noted in the Minneapolis Journal, but they were later divorced in 1936. She subsequently married Paul Dahlstrom, a colleague from Radio City Music Hall, and they had a family together.

She appeared as harp soloist with the Cleveland Orchestra, the Chicago Symphony, the Chamber Orchestra of Boston, the Conductorless Orchestra, the George Barrere Ensemble, the Coolidge Festival of Chamber Music, in duo-recital with Carlos Salzedo and in the New York Trio with Frances Blaisdell and Seymour Barab. She premiered Salzedo's Concerto for Harp and Seven Winds and recorded it as well. She later performed for several years in the symphony orchestra of Radio City Music Hall, and in the 1950s on television in the Firestone Orchestra. She was a sought-after orchestral harpist, turning down full-time positions with top orchestras (New York Philharmonic, Philadelphia Orchestra, Metropolitan Opera) to remain a free-lance artist and teacher. As such, she made many recordings under the baton of Leopold Stokowski.

While she was married to Salzedo, they made a summer trip to Europe to fulfill concert engagements and met with Maurice Ravel. She recalled performing his Introduction et Allegro for him and receiving his instructions on how to perform it. Salzedo presented to Ravel his arrangement of the well-known Sonatina as a trio for flute, cello, and harp. They quoted Ravel's response as, 'Why didn't I think of that?' It was agreed that upon their return the next summer, Ravel would compose a harp concerto. The next year, Salzedo decided he needed to start a summer teaching center rather than make another trip to France, even though it meant foregoing the promise of a concerto for harp by Ravel. Instead, the Salzedos purchased a house in Camden, Maine, remodeled it with interior decoration by the renowned designer Jules Bouy, and launched the Salzedo Summer Harp Colony, which continued into the late 1990s. The harp solos in orchestral works by Ravel may provide a clue as to what kind of work he might have composed.

Lawrence was a dedicated teacher for most of her life, an idealist and a pedagogue, publishing several methods and texts on harp as well as collections of music for performing. The Method for the Harp by Lawrence and Salzedo was her idea, to assist with teaching. In creating it, she created a powerful tool for learning through a modern approach and modern music, and the best description of Salzedo's influential teaching. This began a collaborative partnership of several books. The Salzedo Method, as it is referred to, is perhaps the most widely used harp method book of the 20th Century. It is a deliberate break, in some aspects, with the traditional French approach found in methods by contemporaries such as Renie. It is more of a leap directly from the popular Universal Method of Bochsa into the Modern age, bypassing the late-romantic period altogether.

When Salzedo was invited to found the harp department of the newly formed Curtis Institute of Music, Florence Wightman was hired as his teaching assistant. When Wightman left to take the position of Principal Harp with the Cleveland Orchestra, Lawrence was hired in 1927 as Associate Instructor. As such, she taught the first-year students, who included such legendary harpists as Edna Phillips and Alice Chalifoux. When cutbacks due to the Depression caused her to be laid off in 1928, she was invited to found the Harp Department at the Philadelphia Musical Academy. She was so successful with her students there, as she put it, that after just two years, she was brought back, along with her best students, to the Curtis faculty where she remained until 1933, having become a competitive threat to Salzedo.

Having joined Radio City's orchestra in 1932, her schedule was ultimately too heavy to continue traveling to Philadelphia to teach, so she resigned from the Curtis. She continued to teach privately, and joined the faculties of the Mannes College of Music, later Manhattan School of Music, and Boston University and its Tanglewood Harp Seminar. She also taught at the Longy School, Teacher's College of Columbia University, and gave master classes in Houston, San Jose, Denver, Michigan, Philadelphia (her last master class was held there in 2003) and many other locations. For many summers she taught 10 to 16 students of all ages at Tanglewood, giving an intensive 8-week learning experience of twice-weekly private lessons and weekly master classes.

She served as the first president of the American Harp Society, and as a judge for the International Harp Contest in Israel, where her student Grace Wong was the highest-placed American winner (second prize). Her students have held many important orchestral and teaching positions and won many competitions. They are known for high musical and technical standards.

Over the years, she taught such harpists as Cynthia Otis (formerly New York City Ballet Orchestra, Little Orchestra Society, Joffrey Ballet Orchestra), Beatrice Schroeder Rose (formerly Houston Symphony, faculties of Rice University, U. of Houston), Maria Pinckney (formerly St. Louis Symphony), Grace Wong (Israel contest prize-winner, Rochester Symphony), Sara Cutler (soloist, now NYC Ballet), Karen Thielen (Monterey Opera Orchestra, faculty San Jose State University and Santa Clara University), Susan Robinson (Kennedy Center Opera Orchestra, Ibis Chamber Music Society), Faye Seeman (Wheaton College, Northern Illinois University faculties), Jennifer Hoult, Elizabeth Richter (faculty, Ball State University), Susan Miron (Centaur recording artist), Jacquelyn Bartlett (Artist Faculty, University of North Carolina School of the Arts, FIRE PINK TRIO, formerly Indianapolis Symphony and North Carolina Symphony), Ray Pool, Saul Davis Zlatkovski (artistic director, Harp Festival of Philadelphia), Donald Hilsberg (Colorado Springs Symphony), Elizabeth Panzer (soloist), Ellen Ritscher Sackett (former North Texas State University faculty), Jim Pinkerton (soloist), Hank Whitmire, Beth Schwartz Robinson (formerly Pittsburgh Symphony, faculty Kean University), Lise Nadeau Harmon (New Jersey Symphony, other orchestras), Lois Colin, Emily Halpern Lewis (faculty, M.I.T.), Francziska Huhn (faculty, Longy Schoo, New England Conservatory and Tanglewood), Elizabeth Morse Feldman (Williams College), Carolyn Mills (New Zealand Symphony Orchestra) and hundreds of others with solo, teaching, orchestral or careers that combine all of the above. She also touched countless other harpists' lives as a coach, friend and adviser. Among her final students were Yu-Hsin Huang, a doctoral student at Boston University, and Helen Gerhold. Her former pupil, Franziska Huhn now teaches harp at Boston University, as well as New England Conservatory, the Longy School of Music, and at Tanglewood.

She published with G. Schirmer the seminal texts Method for the Harp, ABC of Harp Playing and Art of Modulating, all with musical contributions by Carlos Salzedo, and Peer-Southern's Pathfinder to the Harp, with one study by Salzedo ("Conflict"), and other preludes composed by Miss Lawrence. She published her many editions of numerous solos, frequently with Lyra, and the ever-popular Solos for the Harp Player, which ranges from baroque to twentieth-century composers such as Alojz Srebotnjak and Rudolf Forst. 
 
She recorded a comprehensive two-LP recording of many works by Carlos Salzedo: his Prelude for a Drama, Five Preludes and Five Poetic Studies, along with Intrada by Josef Tal, and her monumental edition from manuscript of the Sonata for Harp by Carl Philipp Emanuel Bach. She also collaborated with Carlos Salzedo on a Mercury LP recording of his most popular harp duos.

She worked with many composers, including John Lessard, Rudolf Forst, Quinto Maganini, Charles Fox, George Perle, and perhaps most extensively, Ami Maayani. She edited several of his works for publication, though not always named on her editions. She published most frequently with Lyra and G. Schirmer.

At the age of 93, she was still traveling to Boston University from her home in River Edge, New Jersey to teach her students.

She was the leading exponent of the Salzedo Method, in fact its creator in writing the Method for the Harp, and a purist proponent of its aesthetics. Her teaching style was that of a master teacher, correcting technical faults and guiding interpretations. The influence of her education with Edgard Varese showed in how she viewed the sound in abstract fashion and sculpted it with a sense of chiaroscuro. She often referred to Michelangelo in her teaching. She ever sought to give harpists the finest qualities of artistic musicianship. She gave her last master class in Philadelphia in 2003, for the American Harp Society chapter there. At her death in 2004, Lawrence was still presenting new ideas on pieces she had taught for more than 50 years, and was ever searching for ways to improve harp playing, harp music, and its status in the world.

Discography
Transcriptions and Original Compositions for 2 Harps, Mercury MG 1044
La Joyeuse — Rameau – Salzedo
Gavotte — Martini – Salzedo
Play of the Winds — Dandrieu – Salzedo
Spinning Wheel — Mendelssohn – Salzedo
On Wings of Song — Mendelssohn – Salzedo
Spanish Dance No. 5 — Granados – Salzedo
Clair de Lune — Debussy – Salzedo
Steel — Salzedo, from the suite Pentacle
Ten Songs from the Hebrew by Stefan Wolpe, Columbia Masterworks OCLC 57040691; Leon Lishner with David Tudor, Samuel Baron, Lucile Lawrence, Claus Adam, Elden Bailey, Anahid Ajemian, Maro Ajemian, Alan Hovhaness
King David by Artur Honegger and works by Debussy, Vogt Quality Recordings OCLC 27038918; René Morax, Blanche Honegger Moyse, Louis Moyse, Lucile Lawrence, Brattleboro Music Center Festival Orchestra (probably a recording of the Sonate for flute, harp and viola by Debussy)
Benjamin Britten: Ceremony of Carols; unknown choir with Lucile Lawrence, solo harpist, under Franz Allers
Soloist in the following RCA recordings (many re-released on the CALA label and others): Leopold Stokowski conducting
Aurora's Wedding LM 1774
Tristan und Isolde LM 1174
Debussy: Nocturnes, Prelude de l'Apres-midi d'un Faune, Clair de Lune LM 1154
Sibelius: Symphony no. 1 LM 1125
Heart of the Ballet: LM 1083
Stravinsky/Ibert: Firebird, Escales LM 9020
(this is a partial listing)

Soloist in the Concerto for Harp and Seven Winds by Carlos Salzedo (Columbia)
Soundtrack of two films:
Opus 20 Modern Masterworks: Edgard Varese (1992) interview directed by Helmut Rost
Around and About Joan Miró (1955) directed by Thomas Bouchard (she performs a work by Cabezon)

Video
Solo harpist in the Voice of Firestone Orchestra, television program, conducted by Howard Barlow, with an appearance as soloist now viewable on YouTube, and as orchestra member for several seasons.
Interviewed in a BBC documentary on Edgard Varese (ca. 1990s)
The Method for the Harp, an interview and demonstration, with Dewey Owens and Elizabeth Morse Feldman, illustrating the Preludes for Beginners by Carlos Salzedo, and the tone colors devised by Salzedo, also in the Modern Study of the Harp.

Publications
Method for the Harp (with Salzedo), G. Schirmer, pub.
The Art of Modulating (with Salzedo), G. Schirmer
The ABC of Harp Playing (with Salzedo), G. Schirmer
Pathfinder Studies for the Harp, Southern (includes original music studies, with the exception of Conflict, which is by Carlos Salzedo)
Solos for the Harp Player, G. Schirmer
Four Vignettes by Bernard Wagenaar
Concerto for Harp by G. F. Handel, Lyra
Sonata for Harp by C. P. E. Bach, Colin
Variations on a Swiss Air by Beethoven, Lyra
Variations by L. Spohr, Lyra
Six Sonatinas by J. L. Dussek, Lyra
Three-volume collection of music for beginners by French, German, English composers, Lyra
Maqamat by Ami Maayani, Lyra
Passacaglia dans le Style Oriental by Ami Maayani, Lyra
Toccata by Ami Maayani, Israel Music Publishers
Ancient Dance by Charles Fox, Peer
Four French Ritournelles by Marcel Etchecopar, M. Baron

Music dedicated to Lucile Lawrence
Suite of Eight Dances by Carlos Salzedo, published by G. Schirmer
Passacaglia dans le style Oriental by Ami Maayani, published by Lyra
Concerto for Harp and Seven Winds by Carlos Salzedo, published by Lyra
Suite for Cello and Harp by Lou Harrison, published by Peer International Corporation

References

1907 births
2004 deaths
American harpists
Manhattan School of Music faculty
Boston University faculty
People from River Edge, New Jersey
20th-century American musicians